Kořínek (Czech feminine: Kořínková) is a Czech surname meaning "small root". Notable people include:

 Aleš Kořínek (born 1983), Czech footballer
 Ivana Kořínková (born 1950), Czech basketball player
 Karl Korinek (1940–2017), Austrian scholar
 Radim Kořínek (born 1973), Czech cyclist
 Valerie Korinek (born 1965), Canadian historian

See also
 

Czech-language surnames